The Blessed Unrest is the fourth studio album by American singer-songwriter Sara Bareilles. The album was released on July 16, 2013 through Epic Records. The lead single from the album, "Brave", was released digitally on April 23, 2013.

The album debuted at number two on the US Billboard 200, selling 68,000 copies in its first week. The album was certified gold by the Recording Industry Association of America (RIAA). At the 56th Annual Grammy Awards, the album was nominated for the Grammy Award for Album of the Year.

Background
On February 26, 2013, Bareilles posted a video on YouTube stating that she was "Making a Record" and to "stay tuned for more updates." Following this, a video series began with featuring six 2-minute installments showing Bareilles recording her album. On July 9, a week before the release, Bareilles made the album available for free streaming on iTunes.

Songs on this album are reflections of Bareilles' experiences, like going through a break-up.

Recording
The Blessed Unrest was recorded in New York City and Los Angeles in early 2013 with co-producers John O'Mahony and Kurt Uenala. Electric Lady Studios was used to record the tracks in New York City.

Promotion
On March 27, Bareilles announced the Brave Enough Tour, an 18 city US tour ahead of the album's release. Tickets to the solo acoustic tour sold out in just three minutes. In June, Bareilles also announced a co-headlining tour with OneRepublic, setting to begin on August 29.

Sara performed "Brave" and "I Choose You" on Live! with Kelly and Michael on July 17, 2013. She performed "Brave" on The Tonight Show with Jay Leno on July 19, 2013, appeared on the VH1 Top 20 Video Countdown on July 20, 2013, and on The Late Late Show with Craig Ferguson on July 22, 2013.

Singles
"Brave" was released on April 23, 2013 as the lead single from the album. It was co-written by Jack Antonoff from the band Fun. An official lyric video was premiered on April 17, 2013. The song debuted at number 61 at the US Billboard Hot 100, and number 20 on its Hot Digital Songs chart. Following widespread comparisons to Katy Perry's "Roar", "Brave" re-entered the Hot 100 and eventually reached number 23 and number five on the Billboard Adult Pop Songs. The song has received positive reviews, many deeming it as one of her most "anthemic" singles to date.

"I Choose You" was announced on January 17, 2014 as the second single through Bareilles's Twitter's account. The song reached number 81 on the US Billboard Hot 100 and number 16 on Billboard Adult Pop Songs chart. Bareilles released the accompanying video on her YouTube channel on May 5, 2014.

Music and lyrics
Stephen Thomas Erlewine of AllMusic told that the music is "moody and textured, rolling out at a deliberate pace and colored in blues and greys, skillfully skirting the edges of alienation". At Billboard, Jason Lipshutz felt that the album is "exciting when viewed in its larger context as a transitional album; the 12-song collection has its share of light fare that could earn spins on adult contemporary radio, but it's also more lyrically daring and serious-sounding". Elysa Garnder of USA Today stated that the release's "lingering traces of preciousness are mitigated by her sinewy hooks and thoughtful, tasteful delivery." At Entertainment Weekly, they said Bareilles is "channeling Fiona Apple and Florence Welch".

At Rolling Stone, Stacey Anderson touched on that "The Blessed Unrest is full of broad, exposition-heavy vignettes of heartache and resiliency; the songs feel groomed for rom-com soundtracks." Jon Caramanica of The New York Times felt that "vocally, Ms. Bareilles sounds bright, too, and comfortable [...] doing her familiar trick of making the melancholy chirp."

Critical reception

The Blessed Unrest received generally positive reviews from music critics. At Metacritic, they assign a weighted average score based on reviews and ratings from selected mainstream critics, and the Metascore is a 68, based on seven reviews.

At AbsolutePunk, Craig Manning felt that Bareilles built "the sort of stunning and nuanced arrangements that elevate her songs beyond traditional singer/songwriter fare." Stephen Thomas Erlewine of AllMusic noted that "its melancholy is warm and inviting." At Billboard, Jason Lipshutz evoked that the "new album was the result of unrest, but as its title suggests, she has positively embraced her dissatisfaction and subsequently grown as an artist." Elysa Gardner of USA Today called this Bareilles' "most mature and satisfying to date, with fewer of the twee touches that marred her previous fare." At Entertainment Weekly, they said the album is " a lovely collection of confessional sketches."

However, Stacey Anderson at Rolling Stone highlighted that the release "hints at more adventurous paths left unexplored in its abstract piano and slightly distorted harmonies [...] odd, intriguing tools she could use for a  second-act career twist, if she indulges them." Because of this, Anderson noted that Bareilles was "just too diplomatic." At The New York Times, Jon Caramanica was mixed on the album, when he alluded to how "Ms. Bareilles is hiding behind styles that aren’t her own." Brett Faulkner of PopMatters wrote that the release is a "well conceived effort, but not sans flaws."

Commercial performance
The Blessed Unrest debuted at number two on the US Billboard 200 chart, selling 68,000 copies in its first week. This became Bareilles' fourth consecutive US top-ten album. For the year of 2013, the album was ranked at number 134 on the Billboard 200 year-end album charts. On June 2, 2016, the album was certified gold by the Recording Industry Association of America (RIAA) for combined sales and album-equivalent units of over 500,000 units in the United States.

Track listing
All tracks written by Sara Bareilles, except where noted. 

The track listing was confirmed via iTunes on May 14.

Personnel

Musicians
 Sara Bareilles - vocals, piano, Wurlitzer organ, keyboards
 Colette Alexander - cello
 Jason Blynn - guitar
 Mark Endert - production, programming, keyboards, mixing
 Mary-Katherine Finch - cello
 Graham Finn - guitar
 Cochemea Gastelum - baritone saxophone
 Dave Guy - trumpet
 Rich Hinman - guitar, pedal steel
 Todor Kobakov - conductor, horn arrangements, string arrangements
 Csaba Koczo - violin
 Brian Kornfeld - drum programming technician
 Lyn Kuo - violin
 Chris Morrissey - bass
 Brian O'Kane - trumpet
 Stacey Proffitt - background vocals
 Curt Schneider - bass
 Sarab Singh - drums, percussion
 Aaron Sterling - drums, percussion
 Cameron Stone - cello
Neal Sugarman - tenor saxophone
 Yosef Tamir - viola
 Kevin Turcotte - trombone
 Richard Underhill - alto saxophone
Michael Ward - guitar
 Kurt Uenala - bass

Production
 Mastered - Greg Calbi
 Producer - John O'Mahony, Mark Endert (tracks: 1, 2, 9), Sara Bareilles 
 Additional producer - Kurt Uenala (tracks: 3, 5, 7, 10 - 12) 
 Recording assistants - Alex DeGroot, John Horne, Phil Joly, Geoff Neal, Dave Rowland, Alex Williams, Sadaharu Yagi
 Art direction - Holly Adams, Matt Taylor
 Digital Editing - Doug Johnson, Ian Shea
 Horn & string engineer - Jeremy Darby

Charts

Weekly charts

Year-end charts

Certifications

References

2013 albums
Sara Bareilles albums
Epic Records albums
Albums recorded at Electric Lady Studios